Our Lady of Consolata Kisubi Hospital, also Our Lady of Consolation Kisubi Hospital, commonly referred to as Kisubi Hospital, is a private, non-profit, community hospital in the Central Region of Uganda. The hospital is in the neighborhood of Kisubi in Wakiso District.

Overview
The hospital is owned by the Roman Catholic Archdiocese of Kampala and administered by the Missionary Sisters of Our Lady of Africa. It has a bed capacity of 110. The hospital serves a peri-urban population in southern Busiro and Kyaddondo Counties. The hospital offers specialized services including emergency department, outpatients department, general surgery, urology, neurosurgery, orthopedics, internal medicine, maternity services, pediatrics, and otolaryngology. It has three operating rooms and a four-bed intensive care unit.

History
In 1904, the Congregation of the Missionary Sisters of Our Lady of Africa established a health centre at Kisubi to help those suffering from sleeping sickness, which was prevalent in the area at that time. Over the next 110 years, the facility has expanded into a fully fledged hospital, with 110 beds. On four occasions, before March 2010, the hospital conducted free surgeries to patients who could not afford the cost.

In 2019 the hospital opened a new heart treatment centre, capable of performing a cardiac catheterization procedure. This cath-lab is one of the only two such labs in Uganda, as of January 2020. The other cardiac catheterization laboratory in the county is located at the Uganda Heart Institute in Mulago Hospital Complex, in Kampala.

See also
 List of hospitals in Uganda
 Roman Catholicism in Uganda

References

External links
 50 Years Later, Kisubi Remembers Tragic 12
 Uganda: Kisubi Hospital to Offer Free Home-Based HIV Testing, Counselling to Aids Patients

Hospitals in Uganda
Wakiso District
Hospitals established in 1904
1904 establishments in Uganda
Catholic hospitals in Africa